Yvette Yuoh (born 7 July 1989) is a Cameroonian handball player for Tonnerre Yaoundé and the Cameroonian national team.

She participated at the 2017 World Women's Handball Championship.

References

1989 births
Living people
Cameroonian female handball players
20th-century Cameroonian women
21st-century Cameroonian women